Deadlivers is a studio album by American hip hop group Grayskul. It was released on Rhymesayers Entertainment in 2005. The album is produced by Mr. Hill, Fakts One, Bean One, Rob Castro, and Onry Ozzborn and features guest appearances from Canibus, Aesop Rock, Sleep, and  Mr. Lif, among others. "Prom Quiz" was released as a single from the album.

Background
Over half of the album is produced by Mr. Hill, along with contributions from Fakts One, Bean One, Rob Castro, and Onry Ozzborn. It features guest appearances from Canibus, Aesop Rock, Mr. Lif, Abstract Rude, Rob Hampton, and Oldominion members Anaxagorus, Barfly, Bishop I, Destro, Hyena, Mako, Nyqwil, Pale Soul, Sleep, Smoke, Snafu, Syndel, and Tremor.

Critical reception

Daryl Stoneage of Exclaim! commented that the surprise on the album is "that not all of their production fits their macabre theme and most of the memorable songs have production that's more similar to the Beatnuts than anything else." He added that "the production seems to be working a lot more than the lyrics or flows which are fairly mediocre." Charles Mudede of The Stranger called that the beats "heavy, operatic, with background string and horn loops that would be gray and black if translated into the visual terms of cinema." He described the album as "a heady concentration of Marvel comic books, gothic literature, B-rate horror movies, and post-Blade Runner science fiction."

Track listing

Personnel
Credits adapted from liner notes.

 Onry Ozzborn – vocals, production (6, 7), art direction
 JFK – vocals, art direction
 Rob Castro – bass guitar, production (11), recording
 Mr. Hill – production (1, 4, 5, 8, 9, 12–17)
 Fakts One – production (2, 10)
 Bean One – production (3)
 Canibus – vocals (4)
 Barfly – vocals (4, 17), illustration, layout
 Aesop Rock – vocals (7)
 Cip One – vocals (7)
 Miranda – chorus vocals (8)
 DJ Wicked – turntables (9, 16)
 Mr. Lif – vocals (10)
 Abstract Rude – vocals (13)
 Rob Hampton – vocals (14)
 Anaxagorus – vocals (17)
 Bishop I – vocals (17)
 Destro – vocals (17)
 Hyena – vocals (17), illustration
 Mako – vocals (17)
 Nyqwil – vocals (17)
 Pale Soul – vocals (17)
 Sleep – vocals (17)
 Smoke – vocals (17)
 Snafu – vocals (17), mixing
 Syndel – vocals (17)
 Tremor – vocals (17)
 Barry Corliss – mastering
 Justin "Coro" Kaufman – front cover portrait
 Marissa Kaiser – photography

References

External links
 
 

2005 albums
Grayskul albums
Rhymesayers Entertainment albums